Shah Jahan Baloch (born 3 June 1972) is a Pakistani politician who had been a member of the National Assembly of Pakistan, from June 2013 to May 2018.

Early life
He was born on 3 June 1972.

Political career

He was elected to the National Assembly of Pakistan as a candidate of Pakistan Peoples Party (PPP) from Constituency NA-248 (Karachi-X) in 2013 Pakistani general election. He received 84,530 votes and defeated Subhan Ali Sahil, a candidate of Pakistan Tehreek-e-Insaf (PTI).

References

Living people
Pakistan People's Party politicians
Pakistani MNAs 2013–2018
People from Lyari Town
Politicians from Karachi
1972 births